The Purums, are a Tibeto-Burman indigenous ethnic group of Manipur. They are (or were) notable because their marriage system is the subject of ongoing statistical and ethnographical analysis; Buchler states that "they are perhaps the most over-analyzed society in anthropology". Purums marry only in selected sibs; the allowed sibs are fixed by traditional customs.
The Purums are divided into five sibs, namely, Marrim, Makan, Kheyang, Thao and Parpa.  There is no indigenous centralized government.

According to the 1931 Census of India, the Purums numbered 145 men and 158 women, all practising their ancestral ethnic religion; in 1936 they numbered 303 individuals but in the 1951 census they numbered only 43 individuals.

References

External links
 http://cec.nic.in/wpresources/module/Anthropology/PaperVIII/10/content/downloads/file1.pdf
 http://oldror.lbp.world/UploadedData/6938.pdf

Ethnic groups in Manipur
Kuki tribes
Scheduled Tribes of Manipur